Jagannath Kolay  is an Indian politician. He was elected to the Lok Sabha, lower house of the Parliament of India from Bankura, West Bengal in the 1952 Indian general election as a member of the Indian National Congress.

References

External links
Official biographical sketch in Parliament of India website

India MPs 1952–1957
Lok Sabha members from West Bengal
Indian National Congress politicians
1913 births
1977 deaths